Mengha is a locality and small rural community in the local government area of Circular Head, in the North West region of Tasmania. The Black River forms part of the eastern boundary. The 2016 census determined a population of 144 for the state suburb of Mengha.

History
The original name of the locality was “Medwin”. It was changed to Mengha (meaning “toe”) in 1973.

Road infrastructure
The C219 route (Mengha Road) runs from the Bass Highway through the locality to areas further south.

References

Localities of Circular Head Council
Towns in Tasmania